Ram Chander Bainda (7 February 1946 – 12 June 2018) was an Indian politician who was the elected member of Lok Sabha from Faridabad.

Political career
Bainda won the Lok Sabha seat on Bharatiya Janata Party ticket from Faridabad in 1996 , 1998 and 1999.

References

Sources
 
 

1946 births
2018 deaths
India MPs 1996–1997
India MPs 1998–1999
India MPs 1999–2004
Bharatiya Janata Party politicians from Haryana
Lok Sabha members from Haryana
People from Faridabad district
Politicians from Faridabad